The 1986 Soviet embassy attack in Lima was a terrorist attack that took place on July 7, 1986, against the official residence of the delegation of the Eurasian country in Peru. The attack failed to result in the death of any Soviet citizen, killing one terrorist.

Background
After Peru's socialist government and the Soviet Union established relations in 1969, the latter opened an embassy in the district of San Isidro.

The terrorist group Sendero Luminoso had already carried out incidents outside the Soviet embassy for years, mainly due to ideological discrepancies in the left spectrum. One such example happened the year prior, as the Soviet, American and Chinese embassies were attacked in a similar manner.

Attack
The attack began with a series of mass shootings outside the Soviet embassy in Lima. Among the chaos caused by the initial attack, one of the shooters managed to enter the interior of the Soviet residence where he tried to explode a bomb that he was carrying with him, the explosion of the attack failed to cause deaths beyond the suicide bomber himself.

The attackers who survived and saw that their plan failed, fled to the outskirts of the embassy, in one of the suburbs near the residence, two policewomen captured the attackers after an exchange of gunfire.

Aftermath
The terrorist group Sendero Luminoso was accused of being responsible for the attack, or alternatively, a group of sympathizers. Shining Path's official position on the USSR was known to be negative, stating that the socialist state was an "enemy" of its cause of struggle.

The Soviet Foreign Ministry paid a visit to Peru, represented by Vice Minister Viktor Komplektov, who in turn represented the government of Mikhail Gorbachev, and reported that the then Peruvian President Alan García received Soviet support in his war against Shining Path.

See also
1987 North Korean embassy attack in Lima
1989 Callao bombing
Japanese embassy hostage crisis
Deng Xiaoping's dogs

References

Terrorist incidents in 1986
History of Lima
Peru–Soviet Union relations
1986 in Peru
Attacks on diplomatic missions in Peru
July 1986 crimes
Shining Path